Inner Traditions – Bear & Company, also known as Inner Traditions, is a book publisher founded by Ehud Sperling in 1975 and based in Rochester, Vermont in the United States.

Inner Traditions publishes books related to New Age spiritualism and esotericism, mysticism, neoshamanism, astrology, the perennial philosophy, visionary art, Earth mysteries, sacred sexuality, alternative medicine, and recordings of ethnic music and accompaniments for meditation.

In 2000, the independent publisher Bear & Company joined with Inner Traditions, moving from Santa Fe, New Mexico, where it had been founded in 1980 by Gerry Clow and astrologer Barbara Hand Clow.

Inner Traditions publishes other imprints, including Findhorn Press, Healing Arts Press, Destiny Books, Park Street Press, Bindu Books, and Bear Cub Books.

Authors
Notable authors published primarily or exclusively by Inner Traditions include many of the English language translations of historically influential Italian fascist and occultist Julius Evola, in addition to:

References

External links
 

1975 establishments in Vermont
American companies established in 1975
Publishing companies established in 1975
New Age literature
Traditionalist School
Rochester, Vermont
Book publishing companies based in Vermont